Gurley is a now defunct automobile manufacturing company that was based in Meyersdale, Pennsylvania.

Foundation
Tom Gurley was a jeweller and bookseller who also sold and repaired bicycles. This lead him into the manufacture of cars. In partnership with his brother Oscar, Gurley also established the first automobile dealership and garage in Meyersdale.

Vehicles
In 1900, Gurley launched a two-seater buggy with a single-cylinder engine, tubular frame, bicycle wheels and tiller steering, which Gurley built in his bicycle shop. Gurley thought that he could make a profit by selling them at $600, but had to raise the price to $1,000. Very few were made and Gurley ended manufacture in 1901.

References

1900s cars
Defunct motor vehicle manufacturers of the United States
Defunct companies based in Pennsylvania
Vehicle manufacturing companies established in 1900
1900 establishments in Pennsylvania
Veteran vehicles